Philips Top 10 is a Record chart show that aired on Zee TV. It was named so since it was sponsored by Philips India. The name later changed to Colgate Top 10.

This Indian TV countdown show started in 1994 and used chart ratings as collected by Music India Ltd., an association of music labels in India. It was shot in India, Nepal and Mauritius. With tongue in cheek humour and stylised spy vs spy format, it was hugely popular. It was on the lines of Chitrahaar, the international Billboard Chart and the famous Radio programme Cibaca Geetmala. Other popular countdown shows on other TV channels included Superhit Muqabla on Doordarshan, BPL Oye, on Channel V, Ek Se Badhkar Ek, on Doordarshan and Hum Aapke Hain Kountdown on Sony TV.

It garnered its highest television rating point (trp) of 48 during its run time.

Cast
 Javed Jaffrey
 Baba Sehgal
 Bhavna Balsavar
 Viju Khote
 Satish Shah
 Pankaj Kapur as Nitu Singh
 Satish Kaushik as Noni Singh
 Saurabh Shukla
 Shakti Kapoor
 Farooque Shaikh
 Navneet Nishan
 Mohan Kapur
 Sonal Dabral

References 

1994 Indian television series debuts
1999 Indian television series endings
Zee TV original programming
Indian music chart television shows